Carpe Diem is Karyn White's fourth album, released in 2012, and is the first album she has released in nearly twenty years. Notable songs on the album include the lead single, "Sista Sista", and a cover of Cyndi Lauper's hit song "True Colors".

Track listing

References 

2012 albums
Karyn White albums
Warner Records albums